The South African Railways Class 10 4-6-2 of 1904 was a steam locomotive from the pre-Union era in Transvaal Colony.

In July 1904, the Central South African Railways placed fifteen Class 10 steam locomotives with a  Pacific type wheel arrangement in service. In 1912, when they were assimilated into the South African Railways, they were renumbered but retained their Class 10 designation.

Manufacturer
Fifteen  Pacific type passenger locomotives, designed by Central South African Railways (CSAR) Chief Locomotive Superintendent P.A. Hyde, were ordered from the North British Locomotive Company (NBL) and delivered in 1904, numbered in the range from 650 to 664. They were designated Class 10 by the CSAR.

Characteristics
The Class 10 was designed by Hyde to take full advantage of the new  track of the CSAR, which was gradually replacing the old  sections on mainlines. The locomotive had plate frames, a wide Belpaire firebox, outside admission piston valves and Walschaerts valve gear, and was superheated. Its  coupled wheels were  larger in diameter than those of H.M. Beatty's Karoo Class Pacific which had entered service on the Cape Government Railways (CGR) the year before. At the time, the CSAR Classes 10 and 11 which were acquired simultaneously, were the heaviest and largest locomotives built for  gauge.

These locomotives were to form the basis for further development of the Pacific type, which was to become the standard express passenger steam locomotive type in South Africa. They were handsome locomotives and their appearance was enhanced by the use of planished steel plates to cover the boiler and cylinder lagging. They were equipped with two whistles of different tones and a steam turbine generator, mounted on the smokebox between the headlight and the chimney, to power the Edwards headlight.

Firebox
The Class 10 was of an extremely advanced design for the day. It had a rocking firegrate with a drop grate at the front. The rocking grate was operated by a small steam cylinder of  bore and  stroke, arranged under the footplate. This arrangement became standard practice on all new locomotives, except on those equipped with mechanical stokers where it was found preferable to divide the grate into sections which could be shaken separately by hand gear.

Boiler
The locomotive's most striking feature was the length of the boiler and smokebox.

The boiler was fitted with Hornish type mechanical cleaners. Two were attached to the top of the foundation ring at the front and back, and a third to the front plate of the barrel, approximately at water level. The latter was intended for the removal of scum and was operated by a rod, attached to the cleaner cock and passed along the left side of the engine cab. When the scum cock was in operation, steam and water coming through the cock were carried to the front of the engine through a pipe. Both cleaners on the foundation ring were provided with separate hand-operated cocks. These fittings were not perpetuated on any subsequent locomotive designs.

South African Railways
When the Union of South Africa was established on 31 May 1910, the three Colonial government railways (CGR, Natal Government Railways and CSAR) were united under a single administration to control and administer the railways, ports and harbours of the Union. Although the South African Railways and Harbours came into existence in 1910, the actual classification and renumbering of all the rolling stock of the three constituent railways were only implemented with effect from 1 January 1912.

When these locomotives were assimilated into the South African Railways (SAR) in 1912, they retained the Class 10 classification, but were renumbered in the range from 732 to 746.

Modifications
Two of the locomotives were later modified by the SAR. No. 745 was equipped with  larger diameter tyres on its coupled wheels, while no. 746 was coupled to a modified Type MP1 tender. The intermediate draw and buffing gear of the tender, no. 1634 off a Class MC1 Mallet locomotive, was altered to suit no. 746. This modification converted tender no. 1634 to the sole Type XP1 tender. While it had the same coal capacity as the Type XM2 with which the locomotives were delivered, it had a  larger water capacity.

The rest of the fleet remained unmodified and, unlike their Classes 10A, 10B and 10C successors, were never reboilered with Watson Standard boilers.

Service
The Class 10 was placed in service to haul the fast passenger trains out of Johannesburg to Volksrust on the Natal line and to Klerksdorp on the new Cape line which was completed from Orkney to Fourteen Streams in 1906.

In later years, some were relocated to work in the Noupoort area, while the rest were relegated to suburban work on the lines from Germiston to Kliprivier and the Springs-Nigel-Heidelberg branch, or for pick-up work on the Braamfontein-Klerksdorp line.

Upon completion of the electrification projects from the Reef to Kroonstad and Witbank, the twelve surviving Class 10 locomotives at Germiston were transferred to Port Elizabeth on the Cape Midland during December 1959, for use on the Uitenhage suburban and other local services. They were eventually relegated to work as shunting engines until they were scrapped between 1971 and 1972, after 68 years in service.

No. 744 was eventually mounted outside the main station building at Springs, one of the first engines to be plinthed as part of the SAR Museum policy.

Preservation

Of the Class S2, three survived into preservation. By 2018

Illustration

References

1640
1640
4-6-2 locomotives
2′C1′ h2 locomotives
NBL locomotives
Cape gauge railway locomotives
Railway locomotives introduced in 1904
1904 in South Africa
Scrapped locomotives